The 2016 Tampere Open was a professional tennis tournament played on clay courts. It was the 35th edition of the tournament which was part of the 2016 ATP Challenger Tour and the 2016 ITF Women's Circuit. It took place in Tampere, Finland, on 18–24 July 2016.

Men's singles main draw entrants

Seeds 

 1 Rankings as of 11 July 2016.

Other entrants 
The following players received wildcards into the singles main draw:
  Vladimir Ivanov
  Ristomatti Lanne
  Patrik Niklas-Salminen
  Eero Vasa

The following player entered the singles main draw as a special exempt:
  Clément Geens

The following players entered as an alternate:
  Markus Eriksson

The following players received entry from the qualifying draw:
  Lauri Kiiski
  Hubert Hurkacz 
  Milos Sekulic 
  Alexander Vasilenko

Women's singles main draw entrants

Seeds 

 1 Rankings as of 11 July 2016.

Other entrants 
The following players received wildcards into the singles main draw:
  Monica Malinen
  Mariella Minetti 
  Milka-Emilia Pasanen 
  Roosa Timonen

The following players received entry from the qualifying draw:
  Aleksandra Draganova 
  Katerina Filip
  Grace Leake 
  Sandra Ortevall 
  Saana Saarteinen
  Andrea Raaholt 
  Adrija Runča 
  Anastasia Veselova

The following player received entry by a lucky loser spot:
  Emilia Salo

Champions

Men's singles 

  Kimmer Coppejans def.  Aslan Karatsev, 6–4, 3–6, 7–5

Women's singles 
  Piia Suomalainen def.  Emma Laine, 0–6, 6–2, 6–3

Men's doubles 

  David Pérez Sanz /  Max Schnur def.  Steven de Waard /  Andreas Mies, 6–4, 6–4

Women's doubles 
  Emma Laine /  Julia Wachaczyk def.  Mia Eklund /  Katharina Hering, 6–2, 6–3

External links 
 Official website 

2016
2016 ATP Challenger Tour
2016 ITF Women's Circuit
Tennis tournaments in Finland
2016 in Finnish sport